The NZ Drift Series was a five-round motorsport series organised by Parkside Media, publisher of NZ Performance Car magazine. Competing against D1NZ it achieved greater success because of NZ Performance Car and NZ Performance Car TV's marketing power.

The inaugural season was in 2007 and consisted of two rounds at Manfeild Autocourse and Pukekohe Park Raceway.

The 2008 season expanded the number of rounds to five and the number of tracks to four, including Taupo Motorsport Park, and a round in the South Island at Powerbuilt Tools International Raceway, Ruapuna.

The 2009 season continued with five rounds, including the new Hampton Downs Raceway.

The series helped propel some New Zealand drivers into the world arena, with top drivers such as Carl Ruiterman, Gary Whiter and Mike Whiddett being invited to compete overseas in events such as D1GP World Allstars, Red Bull Drifting World Championship, Formula D and European Drift Championship

Television
NZ Drift Series is shown on the TVNZ network as part of Powerbuilt Tools Motorsport and NZ Performance Car TV, and TVNZ ondemand. Battle highlights are available on NZ Performance Car's Youtube channel.

Technical specifications
All vehicles must be a ‘series production vehicle’ of ‘closed vehicle’ unitary construction, rear-wheel drive only. The engine can be at the front (FR) or mid-mounted (MR).
The type and manufacturer of the vehicle is not restricted. Superchargers and turbochargers are permitted, but nitrous oxide is not. The vehicle's engine does not have to be the original, and significant modifications can be made to the lubrication, cooling and exhaust systems, suspension, brakes and steering as long as series regulations are met, and maximum decibel (dB) levels are not exceeded at the track.
Maximum tyre width is 265.

The cars must comply with Motorsport New Zealand regulations for closed racing cars, including a rollcage, fire extinguisher and safety harness.

Points system
The basic points system is as follows:

Final battles
1st – 200 points,
2nd – 160
3rd – 140
4th – 120
5th – 100
6th – 80
7th – 60
8th – 40
First Round losers – 20 points each

Qualifying
Qualifying works on a descending points system with the top qualifier receiving 32 points and the 32nd qualifier receiving one point.

Event entry
Event Entry 20
Pre-Entered Competitors minus 30 points for non-attendance per event.

Miscellaneous
Hard Yards Award – 5 points
Flag infringements - minus 50 series points
Drifting or speeding outside allocated areas on track – minus 20 series points per infringement.
Burnouts outside allocated areas or specified times – minus 20 series points per infringement.
Bodywork infringement – minus 5 series points

How drifting is judged

Qualifying point scoring
Speed: 0 – 30 Points
Angle: 0 – 30 Points
Line: 0 – 30 Points
Smoke/Noise: 0 – 10 Points

Battle point scoring
Speed – 25 Points
Angle – 25 Points
Chase – 50 Points

2009 season

Dates
Round 1: May 16 - Manfeild
Round 2: July 12 - Pukekohe Park Raceway
Round 3: September 13 - Hampton Downs Motorsport Park
Round 4: October 17 - Taupo Motorsport Park
Round 5 (Grand Final): November 21 - Hampton Downs Motorsport Park

2008 season

Dates
Series dates for the 2008 season:
Round 1: Saturday March 22, Pukekohe Park Raceway, Pukekohe, Auckland
Round 2: Saturday May 17, Manfeild Autocourse, Feilding, Manawatu
Round 3: Saturday September 20, Powerbuilt Tools International Raceway, Ruapuna, Christchurch
Round 4: Sunday October 12, Taupo Motorsport Park, Taupo
Round 5 (Grand Final): Sunday November 23, Pukekohe Park Raceway, Pukekohe, Auckland

Results

2007 season

Results

Demise
Parkside Media decided in 2009 not to run NZ Drift Series in 2010 and began coverage of D1NZ in NZ Performance Car starting with the final round in August 2009.

NZ Drift Series in popular media
NZ Drift Series is included as one of the country series in the iPhone game Drift Legends

References

External links
NZ Performance Car

Drifting series
Drift Series